The 1958 VFL season was the 62nd season of the Victorian Football League (VFL), the highest level senior Australian rules football competition in Victoria. The season featured twelve clubs, ran from 12 April until 20 September, and comprised an 18-game home-and-away season followed by a finals series featuring the top four clubs.

The premiership was won by the Collingwood Football Club for the 13th time, after it defeated  by 18 points in the 1958 VFL Grand Final.

Premiership season
In 1958, the VFL competition consisted of twelve teams of 18 on-the-field players each, plus two substitute players, known as the 19th man and the 20th man. A player could be substituted for any reason; however, once substituted, a player could not return to the field of play under any circumstances.

Teams played each other in a home-and-away season of 18 rounds; matches 12 to 18 were the "home-and-way reverse" of matches 1 to 7.

Once the 18 round home-and-away season had finished, the 1958 VFL Premiers were determined by the specific format and conventions of the Page–McIntyre system.

Round 1

|- bgcolor="#CCCCFF"
| Home team
| Home team score
| Away team
| Away team score
| Venue
| Crowd
| Date
|- bgcolor="#FFFFFF"
| 
| 11.14 (80)
| 
| 11.13 (79)
| Glenferrie Oval
| 21,000
| 12 April 1958
|- bgcolor="#FFFFFF"
| 
| 13.17 (95)
| 
| 8.10 (58)
| Windy Hill
| 21,500
| 12 April 1958
|- bgcolor="#FFFFFF"
| 
| 12.23 (95)
| 
| 17.18 (120)
| Lake Oval
| 22,815
| 12 April 1958
|- bgcolor="#FFFFFF"
| 
| 5.9 (39)
| 
| 23.21 (159)
| Arden Street Oval
| 14,500
| 12 April 1958
|- bgcolor="#FFFFFF"
| 
| 4.5 (29)
| 
| 12.11 (83)
| Western Oval
| 33,824
| 12 April 1958
|- bgcolor="#FFFFFF"
| 
| 11.13 (79)
| 
| 9.11 (65)
| MCG
| 38,006
| 12 April 1958

Round 2

|- bgcolor="#CCCCFF"
| Home team
| Home team score
| Away team
| Away team score
| Venue
| Crowd
| Date
|- bgcolor="#FFFFFF"
| 
| 6.6 (42)
| 
| 17.8 (110)
| Kardinia Park
| 15,371
| 19 April 1958
|- bgcolor="#FFFFFF"
| 
| 11.18 (84)
| 
| 10.15 (75)
| Brunswick Street Oval
| 16,000
| 19 April 1958
|- bgcolor="#FFFFFF"
| 
| 11.9 (75)
| 
| 10.8 (68)
| Victoria Park
| 28,769
| 19 April 1958
|- bgcolor="#FFFFFF"
| 
| 9.13 (67)
| 
| 11.7 (73)
| Princes Park
| 18,263
| 19 April 1958
|- bgcolor="#FFFFFF"
| 
| 21.12 (138)
| 
| 14.12 (96)
| Punt Road Oval
| 26,000
| 19 April 1958
|- bgcolor="#FFFFFF"
| 
| 17.18 (120)
| 
| 11.16 (82)
| Junction Oval
| 30,500
| 19 April 1958

Round 3

|- bgcolor="#CCCCFF"
| Home team
| Home team score
| Away team
| Away team score
| Venue
| Crowd
| Date
|- bgcolor="#FFFFFF"
| 
| 11.17 (83)
| 
| 9.14 (68)
| Punt Road Oval
| 33,000
| 26 April 1958
|- bgcolor="#FFFFFF"
| 
| 7.15 (57)
| 
| 7.10 (52)
| Victoria Park
| 34,656
| 26 April 1958
|- bgcolor="#FFFFFF"
| 
| 18.7 (115)
| 
| 9.11 (65)
| Princes Park
| 17,681
| 26 April 1958
|- bgcolor="#FFFFFF"
| 
| 7.9 (51)
| 
| 12.18 (90)
| Arden Street Oval
| 13,500
| 26 April 1958
|- bgcolor="#FFFFFF"
| 
| 13.18 (96)
| 
| 24.13 (157)
| Lake Oval
| 21,809
| 26 April 1958
|- bgcolor="#FFFFFF"
| 
| 10.14 (74)
| 
| 7.6 (48)
| Glenferrie Oval
| 21,000
| 26 April 1958

Round 4

|- bgcolor="#CCCCFF"
| Home team
| Home team score
| Away team
| Away team score
| Venue
| Crowd
| Date
|- bgcolor="#FFFFFF"
| 
| 8.11 (59)
| 
| 8.12 (60)
| Kardinia Park
| 14,045
| 3 May 1958
|- bgcolor="#FFFFFF"
| 
| 7.12 (54)
| 
| 6.4 (40)
| Western Oval
| 24,164
| 3 May 1958
|- bgcolor="#FFFFFF"
| 
| 16.17 (113)
| 
| 8.8 (56)
| Brunswick Street Oval
| 21,200
| 3 May 1958
|- bgcolor="#FFFFFF"
| 
| 11.10 (76)
| 
| 9.14 (68)
| MCG
| 38,966
| 3 May 1958
|- bgcolor="#FFFFFF"
| 
| 13.9 (87)
| 
| 9.15 (69)
| Windy Hill
| 28,000
| 3 May 1958
|- bgcolor="#FFFFFF"
| 
| 12.21 (93)
| 
| 8.7 (55)
| Junction Oval
| 27,700
| 3 May 1958

Round 5

|- bgcolor="#CCCCFF"
| Home team
| Home team score
| Away team
| Away team score
| Venue
| Crowd
| Date
|- bgcolor="#FFFFFF"
| 
| 17.18 (120)
| 
| 9.4 (58)
| Glenferrie Oval
| 13,500
| 10 May 1958
|- bgcolor="#FFFFFF"
| 
| 11.15 (81)
| 
| 14.13 (97)
| Kardinia Park
| 16,391
| 10 May 1958
|- bgcolor="#FFFFFF"
| 
| 16.14 (110)
| 
| 7.12 (54)
| Brunswick Street Oval
| 21,500
| 10 May 1958
|- bgcolor="#FFFFFF"
| 
| 14.8 (92)
| 
| 13.15 (93)
| Lake Oval
| 21,000
| 10 May 1958
|- bgcolor="#FFFFFF"
| 
| 15.12 (102)
| 
| 12.15 (87)
| MCG
| 41,787
| 10 May 1958
|- bgcolor="#FFFFFF"
| 
| 16.10 (106)
| 
| 3.15 (33)
| Victoria Park
| 27,658
| 10 May 1958

Round 6

|- bgcolor="#CCCCFF"
| Home team
| Home team score
| Away team
| Away team score
| Venue
| Crowd
| Date
|- bgcolor="#FFFFFF"
| 
| 11.15 (81)
| 
| 8.16 (64)
| Glenferrie Oval
| 18,500
| 17 May 1958
|- bgcolor="#FFFFFF"
| 
| 6.22 (58)
| 
| 10.15 (75)
| Western Oval
| 21,479
| 17 May 1958
|- bgcolor="#FFFFFF"
| 
| 4.16 (40)
| 
| 8.11 (59)
| Princes Park
| 18,900
| 17 May 1958
|- bgcolor="#FFFFFF"
| 
| 12.7 (79)
| 
| 11.12 (78)
| Junction Oval
| 32,000
| 17 May 1958
|- bgcolor="#FFFFFF"
| 
| 9.10 (64)
| 
| 7.13 (55)
| Arden Street Oval
| 15,000
| 17 May 1958
|- bgcolor="#FFFFFF"
| 
| 8.8 (56)
| 
| 13.17 (95)
| Punt Road Oval
| 37,000
| 17 May 1958

Round 7

|- bgcolor="#CCCCFF"
| Home team
| Home team score
| Away team
| Away team score
| Venue
| Crowd
| Date
|- bgcolor="#FFFFFF"
| 
| 9.16 (70)
| 
| 6.8 (44)
| Kardinia Park
| 16,440
| 24 May 1958
|- bgcolor="#FFFFFF"
| 
| 12.15 (87)
| 
| 8.15 (63)
| Brunswick Street Oval
| 21,000
| 24 May 1958
|- bgcolor="#FFFFFF"
| 
| 11.16 (82)
| 
| 9.14 (68)
| Windy Hill
| 19,500
| 24 May 1958
|- bgcolor="#FFFFFF"
| 
| 11.19 (85)
| 
| 9.8 (62)
| MCG
| 28,550
| 24 May 1958
|- bgcolor="#FFFFFF"
| 
| 9.8 (62)
| 
| 7.17 (59)
| Arden Street Oval
| 16,000
| 24 May 1958
|- bgcolor="#FFFFFF"
| 
| 10.19 (79)
| 
| 7.15 (57)
| Lake Oval
| 17,100
| 24 May 1958

Round 8

|- bgcolor="#CCCCFF"
| Home team
| Home team score
| Away team
| Away team score
| Venue
| Crowd
| Date
|- bgcolor="#FFFFFF"
| 
| 12.18 (90)
| 
| 12.11 (83)
| MCG
| 35,352
| 31 May 1958
|- bgcolor="#FFFFFF"
| 
| 4.11 (35)
| 
| 14.18 (102)
| Kardinia Park
| 19,710
| 31 May 1958
|- bgcolor="#FFFFFF"
| 
| 20.20 (140)
| 
| 9.12 (66)
| Victoria Park
| 26,250
| 31 May 1958
|- bgcolor="#FFFFFF"
| 
| 9.14 (68)
| 
| 9.6 (60)
| Princes Park
| 16,500
| 31 May 1958
|- bgcolor="#FFFFFF"
| 
| 12.17 (89)
| 
| 6.14 (50)
| Junction Oval
| 29,000
| 31 May 1958
|- bgcolor="#FFFFFF"
| 
| 16.11 (107)
| 
| 13.14 (92)
| Western Oval
| 29,118
| 31 May 1958

Round 9

|- bgcolor="#CCCCFF"
| Home team
| Home team score
| Away team
| Away team score
| Venue
| Crowd
| Date
|- bgcolor="#FFFFFF"
| 
| 8.18 (66)
| 
| 6.15 (51)
| Brunswick Street Oval
| 15,000
| 7 June 1958
|- bgcolor="#FFFFFF"
| 
| 12.23 (95)
| 
| 5.9 (39)
| Victoria Park
| 36,500
| 7 June 1958
|- bgcolor="#FFFFFF"
| 
| 12.11 (83)
| 
| 14.10 (94)
| Punt Road Oval
| 18,500
| 7 June 1958
|- bgcolor="#FFFFFF"
| 
| 11.10 (76)
| 
| 16.12 (108)
| Lake Oval
| 18,860
| 7 June 1958
|- bgcolor="#FFFFFF"
| 
| 11.14 (80)
| 
| 8.10 (58)
| Glenferrie Oval
| 19,000
| 7 June 1958
|- bgcolor="#FFFFFF"
| 
| 5.19 (49)
| 
| 7.8 (50)
| Windy Hill
| 26,500
| 7 June 1958

Round 10

|- bgcolor="#CCCCFF"
| Home team
| Home team score
| Away team
| Away team score
| Venue
| Crowd
| Date
|- bgcolor="#FFFFFF"
| 
| 16.11 (107)
| 
| 8.8 (56)
| Windy Hill
| 15,500
| 14 June 1958
|- bgcolor="#FFFFFF"
| 
| 6.15 (51)
| 
| 2.9 (21)
| Princes Park
| 16,000
| 14 June 1958
|- bgcolor="#FFFFFF"
| 
| 8.15 (63)
| 
| 11.16 (82)
| Junction Oval
| 20,000
| 14 June 1958
|- bgcolor="#FFFFFF"
| 
| 12.15 (87)
| 
| 8.9 (57)
| Arden Street Oval
| 15,000
| 16 June 1958
|- bgcolor="#FFFFFF"
| 
| 14.19 (103)
| 
| 8.6 (54)
| Glenferrie Oval
| 16,000
| 16 June 1958
|- bgcolor="#FFFFFF"
| 
| 12.12 (84)
| 
| 10.13 (73)
| MCG
| 99,256
| 16 June 1958

Round 11

|- bgcolor="#CCCCFF"
| Home team
| Home team score
| Away team
| Away team score
| Venue
| Crowd
| Date
|- bgcolor="#FFFFFF"
| 
| 8.12 (60)
| 
| 5.5 (35)
| Arden Street Oval
| 14,000
| 21 June 1958
|- bgcolor="#FFFFFF"
| 
| 12.16 (88)
| 
| 6.11 (47)
| Brunswick Street Oval
| 22,000
| 21 June 1958
|- bgcolor="#FFFFFF"
| 
| 15.11 (101)
| 
| 13.9 (87)
| Punt Road Oval
| 16,000
| 21 June 1958
|- bgcolor="#FFFFFF"
| 
| 8.13 (61)
| 
| 15.13 (103)
| Lake Oval
| 18,500
| 21 June 1958
|- bgcolor="#FFFFFF"
| 
| 9.12 (66)
| 
| 14.15 (99)
| Kardinia Park
| 18,313
| 21 June 1958
|- bgcolor="#FFFFFF"
| 
| 11.8 (74)
| 
| 10.24 (84)
| Western Oval
| 26,080
| 21 June 1958

Round 12

|- bgcolor="#CCCCFF"
| Home team
| Home team score
| Away team
| Away team score
| Venue
| Crowd
| Date
|- bgcolor="#FFFFFF"
| 
| 12.13 (85)
| 
| 11.8 (74)
| Punt Road Oval
| 16,000
| 28 June 1958
|- bgcolor="#FFFFFF"
| 
| 12.17 (89)
| 
| 7.16 (58)
| Brunswick Street Oval
| 24,000
| 28 June 1958
|- bgcolor="#FFFFFF"
| 
| 12.13 (85)
| 
| 10.14 (74)
| Victoria Park
| 21,514
| 28 June 1958
|- bgcolor="#FFFFFF"
| 
| 9.14 (68)
| 
| 12.12 (84)
| Princes Park
| 23,883
| 28 June 1958
|- bgcolor="#FFFFFF"
| 
| 11.14 (80)
| 
| 14.14 (98)
| Junction Oval
| 20,400
| 28 June 1958
|- bgcolor="#FFFFFF"
| 
| 15.9 (99)
| 
| 12.12 (84)
| Kardinia Park
| 15,988
| 28 June 1958

Round 13

|- bgcolor="#CCCCFF"
| Home team
| Home team score
| Away team
| Away team score
| Venue
| Crowd
| Date
|- bgcolor="#FFFFFF"
| 
| 14.12 (96)
| 
| 2.11 (23)
| Western Oval
| 17,305
| 19 July 1958
|- bgcolor="#FFFFFF"
| 
| 17.30 (132)
| 
| 8.9 (57)
| Windy Hill
| 14,300
| 19 July 1958
|- bgcolor="#FFFFFF"
| 
| 16.22 (118)
| 
| 12.12 (84)
| MCG
| 21,395
| 19 July 1958
|- bgcolor="#FFFFFF"
| 
| 19.6 (120)
| 
| 11.22 (88)
| Lake Oval
| 12,000
| 19 July 1958
|- bgcolor="#FFFFFF"
| 
| 12.14 (86)
| 
| 14.9 (93)
| Glenferrie Oval
| 22,500
| 19 July 1958
|- bgcolor="#FFFFFF"
| 
| 8.9 (57)
| 
| 6.9 (45)
| Arden Street Oval
| 18,000
| 19 July 1958

Round 14

|- bgcolor="#CCCCFF"
| Home team
| Home team score
| Away team
| Away team score
| Venue
| Crowd
| Date
|- bgcolor="#FFFFFF"
| 
| 10.12 (72)
| 
| 8.15 (63)
| MCG
| 30,489
| 26 July 1958
|- bgcolor="#FFFFFF"
| 
| 8.15 (63)
| 
| 14.12 (96)
| Western Oval
| 19,508
| 26 July 1958
|- bgcolor="#FFFFFF"
| 
| 11.15 (81)
| 
| 7.7 (49)
| Windy Hill
| 17,500
| 26 July 1958
|- bgcolor="#FFFFFF"
| 
| 10.12 (72)
| 
| 9.10 (64)
| Junction Oval
| 14,160
| 26 July 1958
|- bgcolor="#FFFFFF"
| 
| 15.15 (105)
| 
| 8.9 (57)
| Brunswick Street Oval
| 31,000
| 26 July 1958
|- bgcolor="#FFFFFF"
| 
| 7.11 (53)
| 
| 8.21 (69)
| Kardinia Park
| 14,482
| 26 July 1958

Round 15

|- bgcolor="#CCCCFF"
| Home team
| Home team score
| Away team
| Away team score
| Venue
| Crowd
| Date
|- bgcolor="#FFFFFF"
| 
| 12.15 (87)
| 
| 14.11 (95)
| Glenferrie Oval
| 17,500
| 2 August 1958
|- bgcolor="#FFFFFF"
| 
| 11.9 (75)
| 
| 12.14 (86)
| Victoria Park
| 34,490
| 2 August 1958
|- bgcolor="#FFFFFF"
| 
| 8.11 (59)
| 
| 7.12 (54)
| Princes Park
| 12,984
| 2 August 1958
|- bgcolor="#FFFFFF"
| 
| 16.13 (109)
| 
| 14.17 (101)
| Lake Oval
| 13,000
| 2 August 1958
|- bgcolor="#FFFFFF"
| 
| 11.13 (79)
| 
| 9.8 (62)
| Arden Street Oval
| 17,000
| 2 August 1958
|- bgcolor="#FFFFFF"
| 
| 10.8 (68)
| 
| 19.18 (132)
| Punt Road Oval
| 17,000
| 2 August 1958

Round 16

|- bgcolor="#CCCCFF"
| Home team
| Home team score
| Away team
| Away team score
| Venue
| Crowd
| Date
|- bgcolor="#FFFFFF"
| 
| 9.23 (77)
| 
| 15.9 (99)
| Junction Oval
| 16,500
| 9 August 1958
|- bgcolor="#FFFFFF"
| 
| 11.12 (78)
| 
| 10.15 (75)
| Windy Hill
| 25,000
| 9 August 1958
|- bgcolor="#FFFFFF"
| 
| 7.11 (53)
| 
| 10.12 (72)
| Princes Park
| 24,000
| 9 August 1958
|- bgcolor="#FFFFFF"
| 
| 7.18 (60)
| 
| 13.14 (92)
| Arden Street Oval
| 11,500
| 9 August 1958
|- bgcolor="#FFFFFF"
| 
| 12.18 (90)
| 
| 9.15 (69)
| Punt Road Oval
| 8,500
| 9 August 1958
|- bgcolor="#FFFFFF"
| 
| 20.11 (131)
| 
| 5.11 (41)
| Western Oval
| 18,982
| 9 August 1958

Round 17

|- bgcolor="#CCCCFF"
| Home team
| Home team score
| Away team
| Away team score
| Venue
| Crowd
| Date
|- bgcolor="#FFFFFF"
| 
| 21.11 (137)
| 
| 13.9 (87)
| MCG
| 27,500
| 16 August 1958
|- bgcolor="#FFFFFF"
| 
| 8.14 (62)
| 
| 11.14 (80)
| Windy Hill
| 27,500
| 16 August 1958
|- bgcolor="#FFFFFF"
| 
| 16.11 (107)
| 
| 13.10 (88)
| Victoria Park
| 21,027
| 16 August 1958
|- bgcolor="#FFFFFF"
| 
| 6.14 (50)
| 
| 6.12 (48)
| Lake Oval
| 17,500
| 16 August 1958
|- bgcolor="#FFFFFF"
| 
| 13.14 (92)
| 
| 12.13 (85)
| Kardinia Park
| 12,147
| 16 August 1958
|- bgcolor="#FFFFFF"
| 
| 15.11 (101)
| 
| 13.18 (96)
| Brunswick Street Oval
| 20,000
| 16 August 1958

Round 18

|- bgcolor="#CCCCFF"
| Home team
| Home team score
| Away team
| Away team score
| Venue
| Crowd
| Date
|- bgcolor="#FFFFFF"
| 
| 8.11 (59)
| 
| 10.18 (78)
| Western Oval
| 21,132
| 23 August 1958
|- bgcolor="#FFFFFF"
| 
| 12.16 (88)
| 
| 14.17 (101)
| Victoria Park
| 36,098
| 23 August 1958
|- bgcolor="#FFFFFF"
| 
| 12.11 (83)
| 
| 10.21 (81)
| Princes Park
| 17,897
| 23 August 1958
|- bgcolor="#FFFFFF"
| 
| 16.15 (111)
| 
| 5.8 (38)
| Junction Oval
| 13,200
| 23 August 1958
|- bgcolor="#FFFFFF"
| 
| 11.9 (75)
| 
| 10.11 (71)
| Glenferrie Oval
| 15,650
| 23 August 1958
|- bgcolor="#FFFFFF"
| 
| 15.11 (101)
| 
| 16.13 (109)
| Punt Road Oval
| 20,000
| 23 August 1958

Ladder

Consolation Night Series Competition
The night series were held under the floodlights at Lake Oval, South Melbourne, for the teams (5th to 12th on ladder) out of the finals at the end of the season.

Final: St Kilda 16.13 (109) defeated Carlton 15.11 (101)

Premiership Finals

First Semi-Final

Second Semi-Final

Preliminary Final

Grand final

Awards
 The 1958 VFL Premiership team was Collingwood.
 The VFL's leading goalkicker was Ian Brewer of Collingwood who kicked 97 goals (including 6 goals in the finals).
 The winner of the 1958 Brownlow Medal was to Neil Roberts of St Kilda with 20 votes.
 Geelong took the "wooden spoon" in 1958. As of 2021, this remains Geelong's latest wooden spoon and is currently the longest active spoon drought in the league.

Notable events
 On Monday 2 June 1958, following his superb performance in Footscray's unexpected round 8 fifteen-point victory over Essendon, Sun News Pictorial journalist Rex Pullen christens Ted Whitten "Mr. Football".
 The sixteen match 1958 Australian National Football (ANFC) Carnival is held in Melbourne during a two-week break in the VFL competition between rounds 12 and 13. ANFC President, Pat Rodriguez, remarks that the total attendance of 90,261 spectators at the sixteen matches was an insult to the rest of Australia from the Victorian football community.
Given that the VFL competition was suspended for the duration of the Carnival, and that the total was less than the 99,256 attendance at the round 10 match (three weeks earlier) between Collingwood and Melbourne at the Melbourne Cricket Ground, it seems that his remarks were well justified.
 In the last moments of the third quarter of the round 16 match between South Melbourne and St Kilda, South Melbourne winger Ian Tampion received a free kick. The siren went and Tampion, thinking that he was far too far away from the goals, gave the ball the field umpire Bill Barbour and went to join the three-quarter time South Melbourne team huddle. South Melbourne captain-coach Ron Clegg insisted that he "have a go" and not waste the chance. Tampion retrieved the ball from the umpire and kicked a beautiful 80-yard (73.2m) drop-kick that travelled over the heads of the St Kilda defenders, who had moved up the field towards him, not expecting him to be able to kick such a distance, and scored a goal.
 Immediately after the round 18 matches were finished on Saturday 23 August, evening newspaper The Sporting Globe announces Neil Roberts of St Kilda as the winner of its Haydn Bunton Memorial Medal. The medal came with a cash prize of £100-0-0, and by accepting the prize, Roberts (who, up to that time had played as an amateur) turned professional.
Therefore, whilst he played the entire 1958 season as an amateur, the same as Don Cordner in 1946 and John Schultz in 1960, unlike both Cordner and Schultz he was a professional at the time the Brownlow Medal winner was announced (Tuesday 26 August).
 Collingwood caused a Grand Final upset by unexpectedly stopping Melbourne's attempt to equal Collingwood's record of four premierships in a row (1927–1930).
 In order to increase the sales of the VFL's Football Record which, in addition to the selected player lists, also listed the number that each player would carry on the back of their club guernsey, the Grand Final teams (Collingwood and Melbourne) were ordered to change the "regular" (i.e., that registered with the VFL) playing numbers for each player for that specific match, and only for that specific match on that specific day – and, unless one is aware of this fact (i.e., that the numbers on the back of guernseys on that one particular day did not signify the individual players that they routinely signified in every other match in each player's career), one is either confused or misinformed when viewing photographs, motion pictures, and when perusing other references such as the day's Football Record, relating to this particular match in 2008.
By the established VFL convention (and, thus, the established tradition) that existed before and after this particular Grand Final match, and unlike most other football codes that display playing-position-indicating-numbers on a team's kit/strip/uniform – e.g., Rugby union, Rugby league, Gridiron football,etc. – the number on the back of an Australian rules footballer's guernsey:
(a) has no connection with the position the individual occupies in any particular match,
(b) is issued by the player's football club prior to their first match with that club (and is then registered against that player's name, by the VFL),
(c) usually remains unchanged throughout a player's career with that club, and
(d) is often, as was the case of Ron Barassi's 31, retained by a player, when he transfers from one team to another.
(a) to (d) is also the current AFL convention.
 The reason for this last-minute aggressively pro-active move by the VFL was to halt, counter-act and nullify an attempt by university students to significantly destabilize the VFL's income stream by issuing free team sheets – containing the Grand Final players' names, their (regular) guernsey numbers, and their official selected team positions (as announced on the Thursday evening prior to the match) – outside the Melbourne Cricket Ground on the day of the match.

References
 Rogers, S. & Brown, A., Every Game Ever Played: VFL/AFL Results 1897–1997 (Sixth Edition), Viking Books, (Ringwood), 1998. 
 Ross, J. (ed), 100 Years of Australian Football 1897–1996: The Complete Story of the AFL, All the Big Stories, All the Great Pictures, All the Champions, Every AFL Season Reported, Viking, (Ringwood), 1996.

External links
 1958 Season - AFL Tables

Australian Football League seasons
Vfl season